Neoclinus monogrammus is a species of chaenopsid blenny found around Japan in the north-west Pacific Ocean where it is found on rocky areas which are subject to strong currents.

References

monogrammus
Fish described in 2010